Batas ng .45 is a 1991 Filipino action film directed by Fernando Poe Jr. (under the pseudonym Ronwaldo Reyes) who also stars in the film along with Timmy Cruz, Paquito Diaz, Charlie Davao, R.R. Herrera, and Tito Arevalo. The film was produced and released by Chiba Far East Film International on May 30, 1991.

Cast
Fernando Poe Jr. as PCpt. Celso Magsalin
Timmy Cruz as Gina de Jesus
Paquito Diaz as PMaj. Caringal's Righthand Man
Charlie Davao PMaj. Caringal
R.R. Herrera as Rico Magsalin
Tito Arevalo as PCol. Magsalin
Kevin Delgado as Alex Santos
Romeo Rivera as Fr. Morgan/Jess Serrano
Berting Labra as Oyong
Bert Olivar as Sarge
Renato del Prado as Butch
Danny Riel as Adriano Ramirez
Vic Varrion
Rene Hawkins
Jimmy Reyes
Bebeng Amora
Ernie David
Eddie Tuazon

Production
Batas ng .45 was produced by Chiba Far East Film International, founded by the film's executive producer Jaime M. Garcia, a former stuntman. Timmy Cruz, who was under a contract with Viva Films at the time, was allowed by its top executive Vic del Rosario to be cast in the lead female role.

References

External links

1991 films
1991 action films
Filipino-language films
Films about police officers
Films directed by Fernando Poe Jr.
Films with screenplays by Pablo S. Gomez
Philippine action films
Tagalog-language films